Weston-super-Mare Town Council is a parish council serving Weston-super-Mare in the United Kingdom. The council is responsible for providing the following services: allotments, bus shelters, cemeteries, dog waste bins, noticeboards, parks, play areas and green spaces, public toilets, and youth services.

Current Councillors

References

Parish councils of England
Local authorities in Somerset
Town Council